Sharon Taylor (born 1981) is a Canadian actress.

Sharon Taylor may also refer to:
Sharon Taylor (murder victim)
Sharon Taylor, Baroness Taylor of Stevenage (born 1956), British politician and life peer
Sharon Taylor, co-owner of Bracknell Bees